Longs is a small unincorporated community in Horry County, South Carolina, United States. It lies directly west and northwest of North Myrtle Beach, located at the intersection of S.C. 9 and S.C. 905. Longs consists of many new developments, planned communities, a few golf courses, and many locally owned businesses. The area is growing at a steady pace along with the other suburbs and communities of the Grand Strand.

History
Of historical note, Longs became established when the Long family, who still have descendants living in South Carolina, California, North Carolina, and New York, began the construction of many public buildings and works including a Baptist church. The family moved into the construction and masonry industries with corporations such as JD Long Masonry and Long Enterprises stretching far along the east coast of the United States.

Unincorporated communities in Horry County, South Carolina
Unincorporated communities in South Carolina